Forever + Ever x Infinity is the tenth  studio album by American rock band New Found Glory, released on June 19, 2020 via Hopeless Records and a deluxe version on September 3, 2021.

Background and recording
The band began work on a new studio album after completing From the Screen to Your Stereo 3 (2019), the band's long-running series of compilation albums where the band records unlikely pop punk cover versions of songs from popular films, such as "Let It Go" from Frozen. The band chose to work with a new music producer than in the past - Steve Evetts - the band had pursued him, appreciating the sound he had created with contemporary punk bands. The band had desired to work with him in the past, but had not had the chance, having been signed to a major record label so early in their career, with Evetts being more of a producer for developing bands.

Guitarist Chad Gilbert expressed difficulty in picking the album's track tracklist; they were certain on which tracks should make the final cut, but uncertain on order.

On July 29, 2021 Gilbert announced a deluxe version of the album, now called "Forever and Ever x Infinity...And Beyond!!!" features 6 new songs and will be released September 3. "The Last Red-Eye", "The Devil Has Many Faces", and "New Abnormal" were all written during the downtime of the pandemic. "Ferris Wheel" and "Backseat" which were ideas that were never completed from the original album sessions and a rework of “Puzzles”.

Themes and composition
Gilbert described the album as "for the fans", noting that it sounded like the material from early in the band's career. Music publication Wall of Sound echoed the sentiment, noting that the album retained the band's earlier themes; pop punk about their feelings on romance and girls. However, the publication also noted a hard edge, and heavier guitar sound than most of their prior work, especially in tracks such as "Shook by Your Shaved Head". The track "Himalaya" was described as having influences of pop punk and hardcore punk.

Release and promotion
The album's release was initially announced in February 2020 as being scheduled for May 29, 2020, at the same time of releasing its first single, "Greatest of All Time". However,  due to the COVID-19 pandemic, in April, the band delayed the album to June 19, 2020, Record Store Day, hoping that health concerns would be better by that point. A number of other promotional songs were released ahead of the album's release as well, including "Himalaya" and "Shook By Your Shaved Head".

Reception

Wall of Sound gave the album a generally positive review, stating that "New Found Glory do pop punk songs about longing, lust, and love like no other", though conceded that they did little to convince listeners who did like the band prior to the release. Kerrang similarly praised it for being a welcome sense of familiarity in uncertain times of the COVID-19 pandemic, and stated it was their best album in over a decade.

Track list

Personnel
New Found Glory
Jordan Pundik – lead vocals
Chad Gilbert – guitars, backing vocals
Ian Grushka – bass guitar
Cyrus Bolooki – drums, percussion

Charts

References

2020 albums
New Found Glory albums
Hopeless Records albums